Barnwood Builders is an American documentary television series following a team of builders that convert historic barns and log cabins into modern houses. It is broadcast on the Magnolia Network. Discovery Channel and Great American Country in the United States.
The series is produced by Silent Crow Arts. In 2017, the DIY Network commissioned 26 more episodes of the series. As of 2021, the show is in the 12th season.

Premise
Barnwood Builders follows Mark Bowe, whose West Virginia company purchases old barns and log cabins in order to reuse the hand-hewn logs in modern housebuilding. His team specializes in the reclamation and restoration of pioneer era structures in the eastern United States.

Cast

Sean McCourt (narrator)
Mark Bowe (Seasons 1-present)
Johnny Jett (Seasons 1-present)
Sherman Thompson (Seasons 1-present)
Tim Rose (Seasons 1-present)
Graham Ferguson (Seasons 1-present)
Alex Webb (Seasons 3-present)
Brian Buckner (Seasons 1–2)

Seasons 

Seasons 1-5

 A crew of West Virginia master craftsmen travel all over the country to salvage antique cabins and barns.

Season 6

 A crew of West Virginia master craftsmen travel all over the country to salvage antique cabins and barns. In the season finale, the Barnwood Builders sit down to discuss their favorite things: cabins and barns. They reveal never before seen footage and are joined by some of their favorite special guests.

Season 7

 A crew of West Virginia master craftsmen travel all over the country to salvage antique cabins and barns. In the final two episodes of Season 7, the Barnwood Builders take on their hardest build yet. They construct a giant timber frame house for Project Healing Waters, a place where wounded veterans come to recover from PTSD and other battle injuries.

Season 8

 Episode 4, Mark worked with a client who was on a previous episode a couple season before to build a new boneyard in Texas. In the season finale at the boneyard in West Virginia, they put some walls up on the boneyard to protect them from the outdoor elements.

Season 9

 Episode 1, Mark worked with teachers and administrator of West Virginia University to build a cabin that can be used to show the history of the early days of America.

References

External links
 Official website

2013 American television series debuts
2010s American documentary television series
2020s American documentary television series
DIY Network original programming